is a town located in Shimajiri District, Okinawa Prefecture, Japan.

As of 2016, the town has an estimated population of 37,874 and a density of 3,500 persons per km². The total area is 10.72 km². It is one of the only landlocked towns in Okinawa, but its central location ensures traffic and business remain healthy.

Haebaru is located in the south of Okinawa Island directly southeast of the prefectural capital of Naha.

Haebaru is home to several pachinko parlors, as well as a skate and BMX ramp under the Okinawa Expressway. There is a large ÆON shopping complex and hypermarket.

Haebaru is the birthplace of Ultraman, a fictional television character that grows to a giant size and wrestles with giant monsters. The town is also home to a traditional Ryukyuan craft producing woven fabric or kasuri. It is produced at workshops in Haebaru.
 
In June 2007 dugout bunkers used as military hospitals during the 1945 Battle of Okinawa were opened to the public for tours. In spring 2011, local junior high students began training as peace tour guides in a work experience program aiming to guide members of the public around the caves.

Culture

Haebaru Town Museum

The Haebaru Town Museum is located in the Kiyan district of Haebaru directly west of the site of the Haebaru Japanese Army Hospital. The museum features a reproduction of the facilities of the dugout bunkers that were used for the army hospital. In addition to other wartime artifacts, the museum has exhibits on traditional pre-war Okinawan life and overseas emigrants from the town.

Okinawa Prefectural Archives

Haebaru is home to the Okinawa Prefectural Archives (OPA). OPA was established on April 1, 1995 as a result of the Japanese Public Archives Act of 1988. The archive seeks to collect and preserve the official documents and historical records of Okinawa Prefecture. OPA collects historical materials and records of the Ryukyu Kingdom, the Government of the Ryukyu Islands, the United States Civil Administration of the Ryukyu Islands (USCAR), and the present-day Okinawa Prefectural Government. In 2011 OPA had 12,595 visitors annually.

Education
Municipal junior high schools:
 Haebaru Junior High School (南風原中学校)
 Nansei Junior High School (南星中学校)

Municipal elementary schools:
 Haebaru Elementary School (南風原小学校)
 Kitaoka Elementary School (北丘小学校)
 Shonan Elementary School (翔南小学校)
 Tsukazan Elementary School (津嘉山小学校)

Okinawa Prefectural Board of Education operates area high schools.

Notable people
 Yuken Teruya, artist
 Kei Chinen, soccer player

References

External links
 Haebaru 

Towns in Okinawa Prefecture